Straight to Hell is a 1987 independent action comedy film directed by Alex Cox and starring Sy Richardson, Joe Strummer (frontman of the Clash), Dick Rude, and Courtney Love.  The film also features cameos by Dennis Hopper, Grace Jones, Elvis Costello, Edward Tudor-Pole, Kathy Burke, and Jim Jarmusch. Band members of the Pogues, Amazulu, and the Circle Jerks are also featured in the film. The film borrows its title from the Clash's 1982 song of the same name.

The film has been called a parody of Spaghetti Westerns, and concerns a gang of criminals who become stranded in the desert, where they stumble upon a surreal Western town full of coffee-addicted killers. The film is based on Giulio Questi's Spaghetti Western film Django Kill... If You Live, Shoot! (1967), which Cox was given permission to adapt.

Straight to Hell received few positive reviews upon release, and was not a commercial success, although it later gained a cult film status. A soundtrack was also released. On 14 December 2010, an extended cut of the film, titled Straight to Hell Returns, was released on DVD, featuring additional footage and digitally enhanced picture quality. This version of the film, under the collaboration of Alex Cox, was also screened at several cinemas as part of a midnight movie theatrical run.

Plot
Three hitmen, Willy, Norwood, and Simms are staying in a posh Los Angeles hotel. After failing a job, they take off in a car with a pregnant woman named Velma, who is in on their scheme. They flee to Mexico to escape the wrath of their boss, Amos Dade, and rob a bank along the way. While driving through the desert, their car breaks down. They bury their suitcase of money and begin to walk.

Night falls, and they come upon a town, where they see a demolished car with a corpse inside. They enter an empty bar, where the three men get drunk and Velma pesters them to leave. As they exit the bar, the wrecked car has vanished, but the men are too inebriated to notice it. The group camps out for the night, and the following morning, Velma witnesses several trucks of cowboys enter the town, carrying espresso machines with them. Much to the dismay of Velma, who insists they keep a low profile and leave, the three men enter the town, which is now full of townspeople, and go back to the bar.

There, they are confronted by a gang of cowboys addicted to coffee, and a shoot-out ensues, but they are ultimately welcomed by the townspeople. The bizarre townspeople include a couple who own a store full of piñatas, a man running a hot dog stand, and countless cowboys and other unusual characters. The head honcho of the town, Tim McMahon, invites the gang to a party that evening. The following day, Tim McMahon's elderly father is pushed off of a building by his relative Sabrina McMahon and appears to die. The entire town has a funeral procession for him, and at the funeral, a friend of Amos', named Whitey, shows up looking for the hitmen and Velma.

The town seizes Whitey for being a "stranger", and accuses him of the murder of the McMahon grandfather. During the burial of the grandfather, his hand comes up out of the dirt and grabs the priest's ankle, and the priest shoots into the ground, killing him. Meanwhile, on the gallows, Whitey begins to tell the town the truth about Amos and the hitmen, but is hanged before he can tell his story. A man named I.G. Farben, who claims to be a house manufacturer, enters town with his wife Sonia and introduces himself, advertising his company. The next morning, Simms sees Amos' car enter the town, and tries to get a drunken Willy and Norwood to leave with Velma.

A series of shootouts begin between the townspeople, Amos' crew, and the hitmen, and I.G. Farben and Sonia provide high-grade weapons for the killers. Tim McMahon joins Amos' team after having wrongfully hanged Whitey, and everyone begins to turn against each other. As Simms and Willy run into the desert, a shootout ensues with the town priest. They reach the spot where they buried the money, and Simms shoots Willy as they are trying to lift the suitcase out of the ground. Simms then hears Velma laughing, and turns around only to be shot by Velma and one of the townsmen. After Velma shoots Simms several times, the townman with her is shot by Tim McMahon. Tim and Velma then take off arm-in-arm with the suitcase of money, while Simms and Willy die.

Meanwhile, in town, chaos has ensued, and the town hardware store is set on fire. Amos is shot, and virtually everyone is killed, aside from Norwood and several female characters. Tim and Velma leave the town in a truck with the suitcase of money, but accidentally drive off of a cliff when their brakes go out. Norwood leaves town with the female characters, and Farben Oil Company trucks enter the town to drill for oil.

Cast

Production
The film was not originally intended to be made at all, and the reason for a preponderance of musicians in the cast was the result of a concert tour of Nicaragua that was planned in the first place. Political problems arose concerning the support of the left-wing government of Nicaragua, and the tour was cancelled. In its place Cox decided to have the bands, and several actors he could assemble, make a movie in Almería, Spain. Cox and co-star Dick Rude wrote a script in three days, and the entire film was shot in just four weeks. Cox wrote the part of Velma specifically for Courtney Love, who had starred in a supporting role in his previous film, Sid and Nancy (1986). Love modeled the character after Carroll Baker's performance in the 1956 film Baby Doll.

Alex Cox turned down the chance to direct Three Amigos in order to film Straight to Hell.

Release and reception
Straight to Hell'''s premiere was held at the Pickwick Drive-In in Burbank, California. Invitees were asked to come dressed in "post-apocalyptic fiesta garb." Everyone who arrived was handed a water pistol. The film's premiere was a fiasco, and several people at the drive-in left midway into the movie. Courtney Love was reportedly visibly upset at the premiere.

The film was not well received by critics, drawing mostly negative reviews. In her review for The New York Times, Janet Maslin wrote, "The result is a mildly engrossing, instantly forgettable midnight movie." Hal Hinson, in his review for The Washington Post, wrote, "The action is so gratuitous, and so indifferently presented, that it's impossible to think that Cox ever truly intended it to be seen by anyone outside of the cast and crew and their immediate families." Roger Ebert of The Chicago Sun Times gave the film 1.5 stars out of a possible 4. He wrote: 'After "Repo Man" and "Sid and Nancy," I believed that [Cox] could scarcely do wrong, and that there was a streak of obsession in his genius that might well carry him into the pantheon. Since then I have seen Cox's "Straight to Hell," and I must report that he is human after all. I still anticipate his next film. I still think he has a special gift. But "Straight to Hell" is an indulgent mess...'

In the US Straight to Hell was rated "R" for violence and language. The latter reason caught the producers by surprise, as the writers deliberately refrained from including any sort of profanity in the dialogue. Even the word "hell" appears only in the title (at one point a character quite noticeably says "what the heck is going on here?"), and the insults that fly before a showdown are no worse than "go boil yer head!"

The film was released on VHS in the 1990s and was also released on DVD by Anchor Bay Entertainment on 24 April 2001, but went out of print in the following years.

2010 director's cut
In 2010, Microcinema DVD announced a new director's cut, dubbed Straight to Hell Returns. The new version features a new HD transfer, color correction that changes the look of the film, new effects, and new footage. Blood and additional violence during the shootout scenes was digitally implemented into the film which had not been there prior. Cox stated that he was inspired to revisit the film by Francis Ford Coppola's Apocalypse Now Redux. The DVD was released on 14 December 2010. It was also the first version of the film available on Blu-ray.

Leading up to the DVD release, Straight to Hell Returns was screened at several arthouse theaters across the United States and Canada in October and November 2010.

Soundtrack

The soundtrack for the movie was composed of all new, original music composed and performed mostly by the musicians who acted in the film, however the original 1987 soundtrack release contained only some of the music from the film. The complete soundtrack was not released until 2004, under the new title Straight to Hell Returns''.

Track listing (original)

Track listing (expanded release)

References

External links
 
 
 
 Straight to Hell page on Alex Cox website
 Film Comment interview with Joe Strummer
 Village Voice interview with Alex Cox

1987 films
1987 independent films
1987 Western (genre) films
Film scores
1987 soundtrack albums
Films directed by Alex Cox
British comedy films
1980s English-language films
1980s action comedy films
Films set in Mexico
Spaghetti Western films
Films produced by Eric Fellner
Films shot in Almería
1987 comedy films
Neo-Western films
1980s British films
1980s Italian films